María del Carmen Laffón de la Escosura (8 October 1934 – 7 November 2021) was a Spanish figurative painter and sculptor. She was a member of the Real Academia de Bellas Artes de San Fernando from 1998 until her death, and received numerous awards and honours, such as the Grand Cross of the Civil Order of Alfonso X, the Wise in 2017.

Biography
Carmen Laffón was born in Seville in 1934, into a cultured, progressive, and well-off family. Her parents, who had met at the Residencia de Estudiantes in Madrid, decided not to send her to school. Her education took place in their home, where various teachers visited.

At his recommendation she entered the School of Fine Arts in Seville at age 15. After studying at this institution for three years, she moved to Madrid, where she finished her training at the Real Academia de Bellas Artes. In 1954, she made her final study trip to Paris, where she was especially impressed by the work of Marc Chagall. The following year she had a study residency in Rome with a grant from the Ministry of Education. Her trips to Vienna and the Netherlands were also important milestones in those years.

On her return to Seville in 1956, she continued painting at the family summer house in La Jara, facing Doñana National Park, which would end up being the center of her artistic activity. In the next two years she held her first two solo exhibitions, one at the Ateneo de Madrid and the other at the Club La Rábida in Seville. From 1960 to 1962 she lived in Madrid. The relationship with Mordó would continue later when she set up her own gallery. The group of artists working for Mordó included many of the most prominent names in Spanish painting of the time: Manolo Millares, Antonio Saura, José Luis Mauri, Lucio Muñoz, Eusebio Sempere, Pablo Palazuelo, Fernando Zóbel, and Antonio López. Carmen Laffón's painting style was enormously different from the abstraction that prevailed in the creative circles of Spain at that time, in which Mordó's artists had a preponderant position.

In 1962 she returned to Seville but continued her relationship with Juana Mordó. In 1982 she received the National Award for Plastic Arts.

In 1998, she was named an academic of the Real Academia de Bellas Artes de San Fernando in Madrid. On 16 January 2000, she gave its entrance speech entitled Visión de un paisaje (Vision of a Landscape), which dealt with her relationship with Sanlúcar de Barrameda and Doñana National Park.

In 2006 she exhibited her work La Viña in the crypt of the cloister of the Silos Abbey, inspired by the vineyard that she cares for like a garden at her residence in La Jara. This exhibition consisted of an oil painting paying homage to Santo Domingo, large-format drawings on the landscape of the Santa Adela vineyard in La Jara, and others around the theme of the vineyard and the vintage, as well as a plaster sculpture, later acquired by the Museo Reina Sofía, and 18 baskets of bronze in clear reference to the tasks of the grape harvest.

Laffón died on the morning of 7 November 2021, at the age of 87.

Works
In 1992, an exhaustive retrospective exhibition of Laffón's work took place at the Museo Reina Sofía in Madrid, covering almost the entirety of her artistic career. Her work, made mainly with the techniques of charcoal, pastel, and oil, includes portraits (including two of King Juan Carlos and Queen Sofía), still lifes, everyday objects, and especially landscapes. Since the mid-90s, Laffón has also worked in sculpture.

Museums with works by Carmen Laffón
 Fundación Mapfre
 Bank of Spain Collection
 Bank of Santander Collection
 Museo de Arte Abstracto Español
 20th Century Art Collection, Eusebio Sempere donation, Alicante
 Fundación Juan March
 Metropolitan Museum of Art, New York
 Meadows Museum, Dallas
 Museo Nacional Centro de Arte Reina Sofía
 Fundación Aena
 Caja de Burgos
 Fundación Casa de la Moneda, Madrid
  Collections (MUICO), Madrid
 
 Centro Andaluz de Arte Contemporáneo, Seville

Expositions
 Ateneo de Madrid, 1957
 Sala Biosca, Madrid, 1961
 Galería La Pasarela, Seville, 1966
 Galería Juana Mordó, Madrid, 1967
 Juana de Aizpuru Gallery, Seville, 1978
 Galería Maese Nicolás, León, 1980
 Museo Nacional Reina Sofía, 1992
  retrospective exposition, 1995
 Museo Casa de la Moneda, 2000
 12 Artists in the Museo del Prado, May–June 2007

Awards and recognitions
 National Award for Plastic Arts, 1982
 , 1988
 Gold Medal of Merit in the Fine Arts, 1999
 Tomás Francisco Prieto Award, 1999
 Culture Award of the Community of Madrid, 2012
 Favorite Daughter of Andalusia, 2013
 Manuel Clavero Award, 2016
 Grand Cross of the Civil Order of Alfonso X, the Wise, 2017

References

External links
 Visión de un paisaje at the Real Academia de Bellas Artes de San Fernando

1934 births
2021 deaths
20th-century Spanish women artists
21st-century Spanish women artists
20th-century Spanish painters
20th-century Spanish sculptors
21st-century Spanish painters
21st-century Spanish sculptors
Painters from Andalusia
People from Seville
Real Academia de Bellas Artes de San Fernando alumni
Recipients of the Civil Order of Alfonso X, the Wise
Spanish women painters
Spanish women sculptors